Bob Bryan and Mike Bryan were the defending champions, but lost in the semifinals against Lukáš Dlouhý and Leander Paes.

Lukáš Dlouhý and Leander Paes won in the final 3–6, 6–3, 6–2 against Mahesh Bhupathi and Mark Knowles.

Seeds

Draw

Finals

Top half

Section 1

Section 2

Bottom half

Section 3

Section 4

External links
 Main Draw
2009 US Open – Men's draws and results at the International Tennis Federation

Men's Doubles
US Open (tennis) by year – Men's doubles